Ismail Ibrahim Ahmed is the founder and chairman of WorldRemit, a money transfer company, and director of the Sahan Foundation International.

Career
Ahmed was born and raised in Somaliland, where he grew up in the city of Hargeisa. Before the outbreak of the Somali Civil War, Ahmed was awarded a World Bank scholarship to study economics in the UK at the University of London. After the outbreak of war, with the help of his family Ahmed was smuggled out of Somaliland to reach the United Kingdom as a refugee.

While studying, Ahmed worked in a number of part-time jobs including Strawberry picking in Kent, and sending money home to family in Somaliland. The act of sending money home was important to him, following the tradition of other family members who worked abroad that did the same to support those in need back home in Somaliland. However the financial and time costs of conducting transactions to send money home began to get prohibitive, which prompted Ahmed to begin thinking if there was a "better way to do this". Ahmed has a PhD in economics from the University of London, and an MBA from London Business School.

Ahmed worked for a World Bank agricultural development project in Hargeisa, Somaliland, before moving on to work for the United Nations Development Programme (UNDP), where he helped run a money transfer project. He went to his boss with allegations of corruption he had uncovered in its Somalia programme, "My boss said if I went and submitted the dossier, I would never be able to work in remittances again, and I took that threat very seriously. I lost my job to uncover the fraud." He was later found to have been unfairly treated by the UNDP and awarded compensation of £200,000.

Ahmed eventually began developing the idea of creating a mobile money transfer system which would undercut the higher costs of similar services from banks and traditional money transfer systems.  Before founding the business, Ahmed decided to pursue an executive MBA course at London Business School in order to receive a formal business education and subsequently launched WorldRemit in 2010. By moving the transactions to mobiles, it created an opportunity for many people in the world that don't have bank accounts but may at least have access to a mobile phone.

In October 2019, Ahmed was named first in the Powerlist 2020, an annual list of the 100 most powerful people of African heritage in the UK.  The following year, his company launched the Top 10 Most Influential Africans in the Diaspora list, in order to explore and celebrate the contributions of African immigrants to the USA.

References

Living people
1960 births
British company founders
Black British businesspeople